Neptunicella is a Gram-negative, aerobic and motile bacteria genus from the family of Alteromonadaceae with one known species (Neptunicella marina). Neptunicella marina has been isolated from seawater from the Indian Ocean.

References

Alteromonadales
Monotypic bacteria genera
Bacteria genera